Hatri is a Union council of Hyderabad Taluka (rural) in the Sindh province of Pakistan. It has a population of 29,719,  and is located at 25°28'0N 68°24'0E lying to the north-east of the district capital - Hyderabad.

References

Hyderabad District, Pakistan
Union councils of Sindh